Infrared Physics and Technology is a peer-reviewed scientific journal published by  Elsevier devoted to the publication of new experimental and theoretical papers about applications of physics to the field of infrared physics and technology.

The current editor is Harvey Rutt, at the University of Southampton.

External links
 Homepage

Physics journals
Infrared imaging